The 2004 college football season may refer to:

 2004 NCAA Division I-A football season
 2004 NCAA Division I-AA football season
 2004 NCAA Division II football season
 2004 NCAA Division III football season
 2004 NAIA Football National Championship